Auric Fires is the second studio album by Benestrophe, released in 1997 by Ras Dva Records.

Reception
Industrial Reviews gave Auric Fires four stars out of five and praised the melody and density of the compositions, as well as the band's ability to stand out in the EBM and industrial music scenes. Sonic Boom severely criticized Richard Mendez's vocal performances and said "luckily, Gary Dassing contributes vocals to 'Base of Brutality' and there are a handful of instrumental tracks on the album to keep it becoming a dismal failure."

Track listing

Accolades

Personnel
Adapted from the Auric Fires liner notes.

Mentallo & The Fixer
 Dwayne Dassing – programming, sequencing, effects, tape, recording, engineering
 Gary Dassing – programming, sequencing, recording, engineering
 Richard Mendez – vocals

Production and design
 Angela H. Brown – photography
 Ric Laciak – mastering, cover art, illustrations, design

Release history

References

External links 
 
 Auric Fires at Bandcamp
 Auric Fires at iTunes

1997 albums
Benestrophe albums
Alfa Matrix albums